is a Japanese actor, best known for the role of Masumi Inou in the 2006–2007 tokusatsu series GoGo Sentai Boukenger.

Entertainment career

Television
 Hana Yori Dango (TBS, 2005, episode 1)
 GoGo Sentai Boukenger as Masumi Inou/Bouken Black (TV Asahi, 2006/2007)
 Fuuma no Kojirou as Byakko (TV Tokyo, 2007)

Cinema
 The Prince of Tennis as Shinji Ibu (Animate, 2006)
 Mirrorman: REFLEX as Takashi (Tsuburaya, 2006)
 GoGo Sentai Boukenger The Movie: The Greatest Precious as Masumi Inou/Bouken Black (Toei, 2006)
 GoGo Sentai Boukenger vs. Super Sentai as Masumi Inou/Bouken Black (Toei, 2007)
 Juken Sentai Gekiranger vs Boukenger as Masumi Inou/Bouken Black (Toei, 2008)
 Kamen Rider Den-O: I'm Born! as Newt Imajin (voice) (Toei, 2007)
 Ai no Kotodama as Tachibana Miyako (Frontier Works, 2007)
 Takumi-kun Series: Soshite Harukaze ni Sasayaite (2007) as Izumi Takabayashi
 SS as Akira (Toho, 2008)
 Takumi-kun Series 3: Bibou no Detail as Masataka Nozawa (2010)
 Love Place: Shiawase no Katachi as Souta (2013)

Theatre
The Prince of Tennis Musical: The Progressive Match Higa Chuu feat. Rikkai - Rin Hirakoba (2007)
 Magdala na Maria Musical (2009) as Clara
Air Gear Musical 3: Top Gear Remix- Aeon Clock (2010)
Saint Seiya Super Musical - Lyra Orpheus (2011)

External links
 Junes Project Official Profile 
 Water Orion Official Profile 
 Official Blog 
 Wikipedia Japanese article on 齋藤ヤスカ 
 

21st-century Japanese male actors
Japanese male television actors
Japanese male film actors
1987 births
Living people
Japanese male stage actors